The Kiram–Bates Treaty, also known as the Bates Treaty, was a treaty signed by the United States and the Sultanate of Sulu during the Philippine–American War. The treaty functioned to prevent the entry of the Sulu Sultanate into the Philippine–American War while the United States concentrated its forces in northern Luzon.

Although it is referred to as a "treaty", it was titled an agreement, which was of lesser status under international practices as U.S. law did not require ratification of an "agreement" by the U.S. Senate.

Background

The Spanish Treaty of Peace in 1878 with the Sulu Sultanate had granted Spain suzerainty and permitted them to set up a small garrison on Siasi Island and in the town of Jolo. When the Philippine–American War broke out, the US had to concentrate its limited forces in the north. To hold Moro resistance to its colonization of the Sulu Archipelago at bay, the United States, represented by Brig. Gen. John C. Bates, forged an agreement with the Sulu Sultanate.

General Elwell Stephen Otis sent his brigadier general Bates orders to agree with the Sultan of Sulu:

Otis mistakenly assumed the Sultan was the ruler of all Moros, concluding that Bates simply needed to enter into an agreement with him acknowledging a transfer of the treaty with the Spanish in 1878. However, with a close reading of supporting documents from the Philippine Commission, Bates discovered that while Spain ceded their rights to the United States in the Treaty of Paris, the Spanish merely held suzerainty over the Sultanate of Sulu and not sovereignty. Suzerainty means a relationship between two sovereigns (yet unequal) states, where the lesser ("vassal") state cedes certain political controls (such as trade) to the more powerful state, usually in return for some consideration, such as protection. Sovereignty means complete power and authority of one state over another, having only the autonomy granted or permitted by the sovereign power. Otis overlooked  which disproved that Spain had a valid basis in international law to include the Sulu archipelago in its cessation of the Philippines to the United States.

The memo recommended an entirely new treaty, similar to the British treaties in India recognizing each rajah as a semi-autonomous ruler, using money as a point of leverage. It had been reported to bates that the Sultan's income is notoriously deficient and his desire for American protection is for economic development. Bates used the USS Charleston, the first modern cruiser the Moros had seen, to intimidate the Sultan and his datus into accepting the treaty.

Treaty provisions
In place of the Spanish treaty, the Bates Treaty included the recognition of U.S. sovereignty over Sulu and its dependencies, mutual respect between the U.S. and the Sultanate of Sulu, Moro autonomy, non-interference with Moro religion and customs, and a pledge that the "U.S. will not sell the island of Jolo or any other island of the Sulu Archipelago to any foreign nation without the consent of the Sultan." Also, Sultan Jamal ul-Kiram and his datus (tribal chiefs) were to receive monthly payments in return for flying the American flag and for allowing the U.S. the right to occupy lands on the islands.

The Sultan did not want to acknowledge US sovereignty over his land but was pressured to accept it by his prime minister and adviser, Hadji Butu Abdul Bagui and two of his top- ranking datus, Datu Jolkanairn and Datu Kalbi. Hadji Bagui exerted all of his influence to prevent another bloody war, recognizing the folly of armed resistance against a colonizing world power. Hadji Bagui and his son, Hadji Gulamu Rasul later favored the integration of the Moros into the Philippine Republic.

A very critical error of translation exists in this treaty. The Tausug version states "The support, aid, and protection of the Jolo Island and Archipelago are in the American nation, "whereas the English version read: "The sovereignty of the United States over the whole Archipelago of Jolo and its dependencies is declared and acknowledged. The word "sovereignty" was not used anywhere in the Tausug version.

Consequences of the treaty

The Bates Treaty did not last very long. After the United States had completed its goal of suppressing the resistance in northern Luzon, it unilaterally abrogated the Bates Treaty on March 2, 1904, claiming the Sultan had failed to quell Moro resistance and that the treaty was a hindrance to the effective colonial administration of the area. Payments to the Sultan and his datus were also stopped but were later restored by the US-Philippine Commission in November 1904.

In reality, Bates never intended to ratify the treaty. As Bates would later confess, the agreement was merely a temporary expedient to buy time until the northern forces in Luzon were defeated.

See also
 Philippine–American War
 Moro Rebellion
 Tausūg people
 Treaty of Paris (1898)
 Operation Enduring Freedom – Philippines
 Spanish–Moro conflict

References

Further reading
 Grenville, John A. S. and George Berkeley Young. Politics, Strategy, and American Diplomacy: Studies in Foreign Policy, 1873-1917 (1966) pp 267–96, on "The influence of strategy upon history: the acquisition of the Philippines"
 Robert A. Fulton. Moroland: The History of Uncle Sam and the Moros 1899-1920 (2009) pp 43–58

External links

 Philippine Update: The Bates Treaty
 Bates-Sultan of Jolo (Sulu) Treaty, August 20, 1898
 Tausug Resistance to American Occupation (1898 - 1913)
 Imperial historicism and American military rule in the Philippines' Muslim south

Spanish–American War
History of Mindanao
History of the Philippines (1565–1898)
Muslim dynasties
Philippine–American War
Moro Rebellion
1899 in the United States
Treaties entered into force in 1899
1899 in the Philippines
August 1899 events
United States military in the Philippines